Lincoln Henrique Oliveira dos Santos (born 7 November 1998), commonly known as Lincoln, is a Brazilian professional footballer who plays as an attacking midfielder for Fenerbahçe.

Career statistics

Honours

Club
Grêmio
Copa do Brasil: 2016

International
Brazil U17
South American Under-17 Football Championship: 2015

References

External links

1998 births
Living people
Footballers from Porto Alegre
Brazilian footballers
Association football midfielders
Campeonato Brasileiro Série A players
TFF First League players
Primeira Liga players
Süper Lig players
Grêmio Foot-Ball Porto Alegrense players
América Futebol Clube (MG) players
Çaykur Rizespor footballers
C.D. Santa Clara players
Fenerbahçe S.K. footballers
Brazil youth international footballers
Brazilian expatriate footballers
Brazilian expatriate sportspeople in Turkey
Expatriate footballers in Turkey
Brazilian expatriate sportspeople in Portugal
Expatriate footballers in Portugal